There were numerous battles on the Daugava river (known as Dvina in Russian):
 Battle of Kokenhausen (1601) between the Polish–Lithuanian Commonwealth and Sweden
 Battle of Kircholm (1605) between the Polish–Lithuanian Commonwealth and Sweden
 Battle of Daugavpils (1919), a joint Polish–Latvian operation against Bolshevist Russia
 Battle of the Dvina (1920), a part of the Battle of the Niemen River during the Polish–Bolshevik War
 Battle of the Dvina (1941), during the German invasion of the USSR

See also 
 Battle of Berezina (disambiguation)